Albepierre-Bredons is a commune in the département of Cantal and Auvergne region of south-central France.

The inhabitants of the commune are known as Arapiroux.

Geography
Albepierre-Bredons is some 100 km south by south-west of Clermont-Ferrand and about 20 km north-west of Saint-Flour. It can be accessed by district road D39 coming south-west from Murat and continuing south-west by a circuitous route to Saint-Martin-sous-Vigouroux. District road D239 also starts from the town and heads north-east to join the D16 road north of Laveissenet.

History
The commune of Bredons was established in the 1790s by the merger of the former communes of Bredon and Albepierre. In 1836 part of its territory was detached to form the new commune Laveissière. The commune of Bredons was renamed Albepierre-Bredons in 1955.

Heraldry

Administration

List of Successive Mayors of Albepierre-Bredons

Population

Culture and heritage

Civil heritage
A Fountain at Bredons (Middle Ages)
Château de Beccoire, a royal castle built by Saint Louis, now ruined. It served as a travelling headquarters of the Bailiwick of the Mountains.

Religious heritage

The commune has two religious buildings and structures that are registered as historical monuments:
A Calvary in the public square in Bredons (15th century)
The Chapel of Bredons contains 6 Candlesticks (17th century) which are registered as historical objects.
The Priory contains a Statue: Saint John (16th century) which is registered as an historical object.
The Church of Albepierre contains several items that are registered as historical objects:
A Retable in the main Altar (18th century)
A Louis XV style Thurible (18th century)
A Reliquary Statue: Saint Timothy (17th century)
A Reliquary Statue: Saint Blaise (1699)
A Ciborium (18th century)
A Sunburst Monstrance (1890)
A Ciborium (18th century)
The Church of Saint Pierre of Bredons (11th century) The Church of Saint Pierre contains a very large number of items that are registered as historical objects, including a Group Sculpture: Virgin in majesty (13th century)

Notable people linked to the commune
André-François Voulon, poet, storyteller, essayist, born in 1946 in Murat
Alfred Jacomis, skier, champion of France in 1939, who also participated in the Olympics in Garmisch-Partenkirchen in Germany in 1936 and the World Championships in Chamonix in 1937
Eugene Martens, historian of the Second World War
Jean-Louis Philippart, physicist.
Jean Ajalbert, writer, member of the Académie Goncourt. Born in 1863 in Levallois-Perret, died in 1947 in Cahors, buried at Bredons

See also
Communes of the Cantal department

References

External links
Albepierre-Bredons on the old National Geographic Institute website 
Albepierre and Bredoni on the 1750 Cassini Map

Communes of Cantal